Escape from Television is a compilation album by Czech-American musician Jan Hammer, released in 1987 by MCA Records.

Content
The album contains selected instrumental pieces composed and performed by Hammer that had been used as film score in the American television series Miami Vice prior to the album's release, along with the main theme to the series, plus two of Hammer's tracks that were not used in the series.

Singles
"Miami Vice Theme" had been released as a single in 1985, becoming a worldwide hit, including reaching number one on the US Billboard Hot 100. Three other tracks were released as singles: "Crockett's Theme", which also became a worldwide hit in 1987, "Tubbs and Valerie", which reached number 84 in the UK Singles Chart and number 34 in Germany that year, and "Forever Tonight", which reached number 62 in Germany and number 74 in the Netherlands.

Critical reception

In a review for AllMusic, the album was given four out of five stars, being described as containing "a very strong style of [then] current instrumental music [...] with the edge of rock music and the smooth, spacey appeal of some of the more progressive New Age musicians."

Track listing
All tracks written by Jan Hammer.

Personnel
Adapted from the album's liner notes.
Produced and engineered by Jan Hammer
Recorded and mixed at Red Gate Studio, Kent, New York
Mastered by Bob Ludwig at Masterdisk, New York
Track 13 remixed by François Kevorkian
Artwork: The Complete Works 
Liner notes: Arthur Levy
Photography: Chris Callis

Charts

Certifications

References

External links
Escape from Television at Discogs

1987 compilation albums
Jan Hammer albums
MCA Records compilation albums